Meleh Galeh (also Romanized as Meleh Gāleh and Moleh Gāleh; also known as Meleh Gāleh-ye Jadīd and Mol-e Gāleh) is a village in Siyakh Darengun Rural District, in the Central District of Shiraz County, Fars Province, Iran. At the 2006 census, its population was 150, in 36 families.

References 

Populated places in Shiraz County